Vinca minor (common names  lesser periwinkle or dwarf periwinkle) is a species of flowering plant in the dogbane family, native to central and southern Europe, from Portugal and France north to the Netherlands and the Baltic States, east to the Caucasus, and also southwestern Asia in Turkey. Other vernacular names used in cultivation include small periwinkle, common periwinkle, and sometimes in the United States, myrtle or creeping myrtle.

Description

The flowers are solitary in the leaf axils and are produced mainly from early spring to mid summer but with a few flowers still produced into the autumn; they are violet-purple (pale purple or white in some cultivated selections),  diameter, with a five-lobed corolla.

The closely related species Vinca major is similar, but larger in all parts, and also has relatively broader leaves with a hairy margin.

Cultivation

The species is commonly grown as a groundcover in temperate gardens for its evergreen foliage, spring and summer flowers, ease of culture, and dense habit that smothers most weeds. It was once commonly planted in cemeteries in parts of the Southern United States and naturalized periwinkle may indicate the presence of graves whose other markers have disappeared.

The species has few pests or diseases outside its native range and is widely naturalised and classified as an invasive species in parts of North America. Invasion can be restricted by removal of rooting stems in spring. Once established, it is difficult to eradicate, as its waxy leaves shed most water-based herbicide sprays. However, spraying with glyphosate easily kills the plant in 2-3 weeks.  Removal involves cutting, followed by immediate application of concentrated glyphosate or triclopyr to the cut stems. Repeated chemical treatments may be necessary, along with digging up the roots where feasible.

Cultivars

There are numerous cultivars, with different flower colours and variegated foliage. Many have a less vigorous habit than the species, and are therefore more suitable for smaller gardens. The following cultivars have gained the Royal Horticultural Society's Award of Garden Merit:-
'Argenteovariegata' (leaves have creamy white margins)
'Atropurpurea' (burgundy-purple flowers)
'Azurea Flore Pleno' (double blue flowers)
'Bowles’s Variety’ (violet-blue flowers: also known as ‘Bowles’s Blue’ and ‘La Grave’)
'Ralph Shugert'<ref>{{cite web | url = https://www.rhs.org.uk/Plants/208929/Vinca-minor-Ralph-Shugert-(v)/Details | title = Vinca minor 'Ralph Shugert' | publisher = RHS | access-date = 5 March 2021}}</ref>

 Medicinal use: chemical constituents Vinca minor contains more than 50 alkaloids, including vincamine.  Other alkaloids include reserpine, reserpinine, akuammicine, majdine, vinerine, ervine, vineridine, tombozine, vincamajine, vincanine, vincanidine, vincamone, apovincamine, vincaminol, desoxyvincaminol, vincorine and perivincine.

Vinpocetine (brand names: Cavinton, Intelectol; chemical name: ethyl apovincaminate) is a semisynthetic derivative alkaloid of vincamine.

Colour
The colour name periwinkle is derived from the flower.

References

Further reading
Flora Europaea: Vinca minor distribution
Morphology and ecology of Vinca minor (in Spanish)
Borealforest: Vinca minor
Vinca minor (from Ohio State University's Pocket Gardener)
Common periwinkle (as an invasive species; includes photos)
Blamey, M., & Grey-Wilson, C. (1989). Flora of Britain and Northern Europe. Hodder & Stoughton.
Huxley, A., ed. (1992). New RHS Dictionary of Gardening'' 4: 665. Macmillan.
detailed technical description
Encyclopedia of Life database entry

External links

 Traditional Medicine Uses:  Vinca minor
 
 
 

minor
Medicinal plants of Europe
Groundcovers
Garden plants of Europe
Plants described in 1753
Taxa named by Carl Linnaeus
Subshrubs